"Procession" is the second single by the British group New Order, released in September 1981 on 7" vinyl record.It is a double A side with Everything's gone Green.  The single's Factory Records catalogue number is FAC 53. (Labelled as B Music)

Overview

Compared to the band's previous single "Ceremony", this one shows the band in an intermediate position between post-punk Joy Division and light electropop New Order. The lighter pop optimism, with a strong emphasis on rhythm, overcomes the song's gloomy title, "Procession". This "mixed message" may help to explain why the song remains obscure in the New Order repertoire, despite having been a single. The sound is much like Movement'''s opening track, "Dreams Never End", but with an even more upbeat flavor and vocals that have nearly shed the Ian Curtis imitation. The lyrics are abstract and difficult to discern, given the density of the mix and the strength of the other instruments. The song is notable, also, because there are brief backing vocals by band member Gillian Gilbert.

Though all of New Order's songs are credited as group compositions, it is stated in Peter Hook's memoir Substance: Inside New Order that the chief composer of "Procession" is Stephen Morris.

The song does not appear on any of New Order's studio albums; it does, however, appear on the EP 1981–1982, the CD, cassette, and Digital Audio Tape releases of the 1987 singles compilation Substance (where it is erroneously listed as a B-side), the 2005 compilation Singles, and the 2008 Collector's Edition of the band's debut album Movement.

Artwork
Similar to the album cover for Movement'', the artwork is taken from a "Dinamo Futurista" magazine cover done by Italian futurist designer Fortunato Depero. Notably, the UK release's sleeve came in nine versions, all with different colours: black, blue, aqua, yellow, red, brown, orange, green and purple. The second side of the single contains a shortened version of "Everything's Gone Green", the full-length version of which was later released as a 12" single on its own.

Although the original UK single does not indicate which is side A or B (the runoff matrix simply lists "SOFT" and "HARD" for each side), the French edition of the single actually has "Everything's Gone Green" labeled as the A-side track, and some Spanish and Portuguese pressings have reversed labels.

Track listing

Chart positions

References

New Order (band) songs
1981 singles
Songs written by Bernard Sumner
Songs written by Peter Hook
Songs written by Stephen Morris (musician)
Songs written by Gillian Gilbert
Factory Records singles
1981 songs
UK Independent Singles Chart number-one singles